is a railway station on the Kyūdai Main Line operated by JR Kyushu in Yufu, Ōita Prefecture, Japan.

Lines

Layout 
The station consists of two side platforms serving two tracks at grade. The station building, a wooden strutre of traditional Japanese design with white plaster walls and a tiled roof, is unstaffed and serves only to house a waiting room and an automatic ticket vending machine. Access to the opposite side platform is by means of a level crossing with ramps. Next to the station building is a bike shed with a tiled roof to match.

Adjacent stations

History
The Daito Railway was nationalized on 1 December 1922, after which Japanese Government Railways (JGR) undertook phased westward expansion of the track which, at the time, it had designated as the Daito Line. By 1923, the track had reached  and then, on 29 July 1925, Yufuin (then known as Kita-Yufuin) was established as the new western terminus. Minami-Yufu was opened on the same day as an intermediate station along the new track. On 15 November 1934, when the Daito Line had linked up with the Kyudai Main Line further west, JGR designated the station as part of the Kyudai Main Line. With the privatization of Japanese National Railways (JNR), the successor of JGR, on 1 April 1987, the station came under the control of JR Kyushu.

Passenger statistics
In fiscal 2015, there were a total of 18,548 boarding passengers, giving a daily average of 51 passengers.

See also
 List of railway stations in Japan

References

External links
Minami-Yufu (JR Kyushu)

Railway stations in Ōita Prefecture
Railway stations in Japan opened in 1925